Camden is a surname. Notable people with the surname include:

 Marquess Camden
 Lady Camden
 Archie Camden (1989–2014), British bassoonist
 Johnson N. Camden (1828–1908), American politician
 Johnson N. Camden Jr. (1865–1942), American politician
 Peter G. Camden (1801–1873), mayor of St. Louis, Missouri
 William Camden (1551–1623), English antiquary and historian
Robert Camden Cope

English-language surnames
English toponymic surnames